Maria Joanna Poprzęcka (born 20 October 1942 in Warsaw) is a Polish art historian, who served as the director of the Institute of Art History at the University of Warsaw till 2008. A member of the Polish Academy of Arts and Sciences, she has served on the jury for the Nike Award, and was the recipient of the Order of Polonia Restituta in 2003, the Gdynia Literary Prize in 2009, and the Medal for Merit to Culture – Gloria Artis in 2012.

References 

1942 births
Living people
Polish art historians
Polish historians
Polish women historians
Women art historians
Polish curators
Polish women curators